The A2 Helmet is a standard issued combat helmet of the Vietnam People's Army. It was introduced around 2014, the exact date is unknown as the Vietnamese government does not publicly share information. They are the standard issued helmet in the Vietnam People's Army.

As the Special Forces, Border Guards, and Marines use domestically-produced or Israeli imported PASGT Helmets, they only use the A2 Helmets for training exercises.

History 
Up until 2014, a majority of the Vietnam People's Army were still using Pith Helmets. These Pith Helmets also saw significant use during the Vietnam War. Around 2014, the army began to mass-produce these A2 Helmets to replace older equipment in the army, while still being cost-effective. They are now the standard issue helmet commonly used across all branches of the army.

Design 
Although the helmet is shaped like a Kevlar helmet, there are no kevlar materials in the helmet. 

The helmet is made of Polyamide Plastic. It is designed with double-layered plastic cladding that are overlapped, foam lining, and mesh fabric on the inside.

As it is not bulletproof, its main purpose is as a helmet for training exercises. It does however protect the user against explosive fragments. Therefore, the PASGT helmet would be used in combat situations.

They are commonly clothed with camouflage, or the camouflaged is directly painted on.

References 

Combat helmets of Vietnam
Military equipment introduced in the 2010s